José Abelardo Vegazzi (26 February 1929 – 7 January 2005) was an Argentine swimmer who competed at the 1948 Summer Olympics in the 100 m backstroke.

References

1929 births
2005 deaths
Swimmers at the 1948 Summer Olympics
Olympic swimmers of Argentina
Argentine male backstroke swimmers